Zsófia Szilágyi was a Hungarian noblewoman from the  House of Szilágyi, she was the daughter of László Szilágyi and Katalin Bellyéni. Zsófia Szilágyi was the wife of Péter Geréb de Vingárt, vice-voivode of Transylvania.

Zsófia Szilágyi had the following children:
István
Lõrinc
Péter, which was Hetman of Oberschlesien and Palatine of the Kingdom of Hungary, he married Dorottya Kanizsai
Mátyás,  which was Ban of Croatia (1483–1489) and Ban of Slavonia
László (born after 1447 - d. 25.7.1502), which was Archbishop of Kalocsa

References 

Zsofia
15th-century Hungarian people
15th-century Hungarian women
Medieval Hungarian nobility
15th-century Hungarian nobility